Louis Florian Dekker (4 July 1894 – 13 May 1973) was a Dutch coxswain. He competed at the 1924 Summer Olympics in Paris with the men's coxed four where they did not finish in the final round.

References

1894 births
1973 deaths
Dutch male rowers
Olympic rowers of the Netherlands
Rowers at the 1924 Summer Olympics
Rowers from Amsterdam
Coxswains (rowing)
European Rowing Championships medalists
20th-century Dutch people